Latoya Brulee (born 9 December 1988) is a Belgian racing cyclist. She competed in the 2013 UCI women's time trial in Florence.

See also
2008 AA-Drink Cycling Team season

References

External links

1988 births
Living people
Belgian female cyclists
People from Eeklo
Cyclists from East Flanders
21st-century Belgian women